Yunak is a town and district of Konya Province in the Central Anatolia region of Turkey. According to the 2000 census, the population of the district is 41,506, of which 12,734 live in the town of Yunak.

Notes

References

External links
 District governor's official website 
 District municipality's official website 

Populated places in Konya Province
Districts of Konya Province